Bakharz Rural District is a rural district (dehestan) in the Central District of Bakharz County, Razavi Khorasan Province, Iran. At the 2006 census, its population was 16,077, in 3,640 families.  The rural district has 29 villages.

References 

Rural Districts of Razavi Khorasan Province
Bakharz County